Strictly the Best vol. 47 is a compilation dancehall album from VP Records. It is released on December 4, 2012, along with Strictly The Best vol. 46. Strictly The Best (STB) is one of the longest compilation series in reggae music and the music  business. The series was launched in 1991. Every Year, VP Records releases two STB series, one for Reggae and another one for Dancehall, a series highlighting the biggest hits and the artists in reggae & dancehall of the year from new artists to top stars. In contrast with a reggae compilation album STB vol. 46,  STB vol. 47 features dancehall and hard-core party tunes. Also like STB vol. 46, STB vol. 47 is a double disc CD. Disc one includes current hits from Popcaan, I-Octane, Mr. Vegas, RDX, Konshens, Vybz Kartel, Cherine Anderson with DI, Sean Paul with Kelly Rowland, Tommy Lee Sparta, Aidonia, and Bounty Killer.   Disc two is a set of classic dancehall hits that are still favored in current dance scene. Featured artists from disc two are: Ini Kamoze, Nardo Ranks, Gregory Peck, Red Fox & Naturalee, Beenie Man, Tony Curtis, Tanya Stephens, Captain Barkey, Fabby Dolly, Ding Dong, Bounty Killer, Capleton. The CD cover was designed and created by Clovis Brown.

Executive producers
Chris Chin

Track listing

Disc 1

Disc 2

References

2012 compilation albums
Reggae compilation albums